Anna Lomax Wood is an anthropologist, ethnomusicologist and public folklorist. She is the president of the Association for Cultural Equity (ACE), established in 1985 by her father, musicologist Alan Lomax, at Hunter College, CUNY.

Biography and personal life
Wood was born in New York City on November 20, 1944, and grew up in the folk music scene in New York City and London. Her mother was Elizabeth Lyttleton Harold, a writer and poet from Blanco, Texas. Following her parents divorce in 1950 Wood and her mother moved to the Lower East Side, and subsequently to Italy, where the latter met (and later married) Herb Sturz. They settled in a coastal village in Franco's Spain where they wrote Reapers of the Storm, a novel about the village after the Spanish Civil War. Forced to flee to London, they moved in with Alan Lomax and a menage which included Peggy Seeger.

At 17 Wood entered the workforce also assisting her father when he was recording in the Caribbean, in dance film research, and on albums he published on Folkways. In the 1970s Wood trained as a film editor on Lionel Rogosin's Back to Africa and Black Roots, 1970, worked for documentary filmmaker Les Blank, and studied with visionary abstract filmmaker, Scott Bartlett. She later made several films of her own.

In 1977 she married William Apollinaire Chairetakis (1947-1992), a physicist from Chanea, Crete, with whom she had a son, Odysseus Desmond Chairetakis (b. 1985).

Wood obtained her B.A. cum laude in 1975 at the School for General Studies at Columbia University, and entered Columbia's graduate anthropology program, where she studied under Joan Vincent and Conrad Arensberg, obtaining a doctorate with distinction in 1991. Her dissertation is a comparative study of the impact of historical social formations on earthquake recovery in the Sele Valley, Campania. She jointed Rocco Caporale and Ino Rossi in a multi-year study of disaster recovery and reconstruction after the 1980 earthquake in Campania and Basilicata, Italy funded by the National Science Foundation. 

1992-94 Wood worked at the Children's Board of Hillsborough County (Tampa, Florida), and subsequently taught at the University of South Florida, where she designed and implemented ethnographic studies in John's Island, SC, Ayden, NC, Alliance, Ohio, and Watsonville, CA.

In 2003 she married Edmund R. Wood, an entrepreneur in the oil and gas business in Marshall, TX, the same East Texas town where her maternal great-grandfather, H.T. Littleton (born in Fleming Co., Kentucky) had been the first District Judge.

Public folklore and folklore activism
Wood served for twenty years as a public folklorist working with Italian immigrants from Northern and Southern Italy and Sicily to produce festivals, concerts, workshops, and music tours. She also worked with Spanish and Greek immigrant artists. In 1979 and 1986–87, Wood produced and annotated several LPs of Southern Italian, Sicilian, and Northern Italian traditional music published by Folkways and Global Village Music. With anthropologist Paolo Apolito and the late artist and folklorist Giovanni Coffarelli, Wood arranged for Italian and Italian American folk artists to participate in a series of tours produced by the Ethnic Folk Arts Center (now the Center for Traditional Music and Dance) in the 1980s in New York, New Jersey and the Southeast, aimed at reconnecting immigrants with the musical traditions they had left behind.

Wood moved to Florida and extended her research to the Greek-American community in Tarpon Springs, where she recorded the complete repertoire of Kalymnian-American bagpiper, Nikitas Tsimouris, and his family. Tsimouris received an NEA National Heritage Fellowship Award in 1989. Calabrian folk artists Giuseppe and Raffaela DeFranco of Belleville, New Jersey, with whom Wood had worked for many years, were awarded a Heritage Fellowship in 1994.

Publishing Alan Lomax's recordings 
In partnership with producer and attorney Jeffrey Alan Greenberg (1951-2020), Wood produced, compiled, and edited the massive Alan Lomax Collection on Rounder Records, a scholarly edition of 100-plus CDs of Lomax's recordings in 16 series—Southern Journey; Deep River of Song (including recordings made by John Avery Lomax, Wood's grandfather), The Spanish Recordings, Italian Treasury, Caribbean Voyage, the World Library of Folk and Primitive Music (including Spain, Ireland, Scotland, England, France, Romania, India, and Yugoslavia), Prison Songs; Portraits (albums dedicated Lomax's recordings of Fred McDowell, Jeannie Robertson, Margaret Barry, Jimmy McBeath, Harry Cox, Texas Gladden, Neville Marcano, Hobart Smith, Davie Stewart, and John Strachan); Classic Louisiana Recordings; Christmas Songs; Folk Songs of England, Ireland, Scotland & Wales; Concerts and Radio; and the Songbook series. Rounder Records made it possible for Steve Rosenthal of the Magic Shop to restore and digitize all the audio in the archive. The scholars and specialists who edited and annotated the recordings include David Evans, Kenneth Bilby, Morton Marks, Donald Hill, Kip Lornell, Judith Cohen, Roger Abrahams, Luisa del Giudice, Sandra Tarantino, Sergio Bonanzinga, Goffredo Plastino, Lorna McDaniel, John Cohen, Steven Wade, Maureen Warner Lewis, Barry Jean Ancelet, Peter Kennedy, Margaret Bennet, Ewan McVicar, Adriana Gandolfi, Domenico Di Virgilio, and Mauro Balma.

In 2005, Rounder issued the 8-CD box-set, Jelly Roll Morton: The Complete Library of Congress Recordings, which included a reissue of Alan Lomax's 1952, book, Mr. Jelly Roll. The set received two Grammy awards: for Best Historical Album (to Anna Lomax Wood and Jeff Greenberg, Executive Producers, and Steve Rosenthal, Sound Engineer) and for Best Album Notes to John Szwed. In 2009, Harte Records issued Alan Lomax in Haiti, a 10-CD box set of Alan Lomax's historic 1936–37 recordings from a trip undertaken for the Library of Congress, re-mastered and restored from the original aluminum discs. The set included original 1937 photographs and film footage by Elizabeth Harold Lomax; liner notes by ethnomusicologist Gage Averill in English, French and Kreyol; transcriptions and translations by Louis Carl St. Jean; and a book with Alan Lomax's Haitian diary, correspondence, and field notes, edited by Ellen Harold. In 2011, it garnered two Grammy nominations: for Best Historical Box Set and Best Album Notes. With the Green Foundation and Gage Averill, Wood explored returning digital copies of the Haiti recordings and films to communities of origin and to the National Archives of Haiti.

In tandem with publication, Wood launched a systematic effort to locate artists and heirs due royalties and fees from publishing and licensing activities.

Association for Cultural Equity
When her father retired in 1996, Wood took charge of the Association for Cultural Equity to find a home for Lomax's massive archive and bring his most important unfinished  projects to fruition. Together with Jeffrey Greenberg, collaborators and staff, including Gideon D'Arcangelo, Matthew Barton, Andrew Kaye, Bertram Lyons, Don Fleming, Kiki Smith-Archiapatti, Richard Smith, Nathan Salsburg, and Ellen Harold, as well as her father's nieces and nephews, John Lomax III, Naomi Hawes Bishop, John Melville Bishop, Corey Denos and Nicholas Hawes, and her son, Odysseus Chairetakis, Wood preserved, digitized and disseminated his archive at Hunter College and depositing the originals at the American Folklife Center at the Library of Congress in 2004, which marked the beginning of a close partnership between ACE and the AFC.

Repatriation was an essential aspect Alan Lomax's vision of cultural equity; Wood expanded this in ACE's mission, with a goal of placing cultural resources in the hands of their creators and to support communities in developing them for their benefit. In 2006, with musicologists Samuel Floyd and Rosita Sands of the Center for Black Music Research at Columbia College, Chicago, Wood launched an extensive initiative to return Lomax's recordings, photographs and documents to the Caribbean. This grew into ACE's Repatriation Program which, in 2020, reached over 50 country, regional, and community libraries and local repositories in the U.S., the Caribbean, Britain and Ireland, Spain, and Italy engaging and collaborating with local communities in curating, renewing their traditions.

Wood and ACE staff created a free online archive of all Lomax's media collections annotated by an area specialist. On January 30, 2012, The New York Times reported that the Association for Cultural Equity was making publicly available Alan Lomax's entire archive of post-1942 recordings, films, and photos for streaming on the World Wide Web through the newly launched Alan Lomax Archive and a YouTube channel of video clips depicting regional American folk songs and folklife (digitized with a Save America's Treasures grant) curated by Nathan Salsburg. As of Feb 25, 2021, it has reached nearly 28 million views and 84,000 subscribers.

Wood developed the Endangered Cultures Initiative at ACE, proposing complete recorded surveys of the expressive traditions of a community to be carried out by a community member, with the resulting documentation belonging to the community. ACE supports, trains and mentors an emerging leader from an unrecorded culture to document the full range of expressive arts in his community and to prepare the results for archiving, viewing, research, and ready access. The community owns the physical recordings and intellectual property, and may choose or not to deposit copies in world and regional libraries. The pilot project involved Dominic (Donato) Raimondo, a South Sudanese Didinga and former "Lost Boy", documenting and cataloging his tribe's music, dance, and storytelling at Kakuma Refugee camp in Kenya, and returning to discuss the significance, care, and uses of this documentation with elders, youth, and other.  Lamont Jack Pearly, an African American blues singer, scholar and online media host, is documenting the disappearing African American storefront church.

The Global Jukebox and Cantometrics Research 
The Global Jukebox is a web application that maps world song, dance and speech against strategies of human adaptation. It is a freely accessible, annotated source for curated examples of performance traditions from throughout the world  including nearly 6000 examples of traditional and indigenous music. It began as a prototype created by Alan Lomax and Michael del Rio in the 1990s, based on comprehensive comparative research on performing arts carried out from 1960 to 1993 by Lomax, Conrad Arensberg, Victor Grauer, Irmgard Bartenieff, Forrestine Paulay, and Norman Markel and others.

In 2017, Wood, together with media architect Gideon D'Arcangelo, developer John Szinger and a team of researchers and designers, redesigned and updated the concept and brought the Global Jukebox to the web.

Selected publications
"Musical Practice and Memory on the Edge of Two Worlds: Kalymnian Tsambóuna and Song Repertoire in the Family of Nikitas Tsimouris" in The Florida Folklife Reader. Tina Bucuvalas, Editor. University of Mississippi Press, 2011.
"Giuseppe De Franco (1933–2010): A Remembrance of an Immigrant Folk Musician" in The Italian American Review 1 (2): 2011.
"Doppio Solitario", in Alan Lomax. L'Anno Piu Felice della Mia Vita. Plastino, Goffredo, Editor. Saggiatore, 2008.
"Tears of Blood: The Calabrian Villanella and Immigrant Epiphanies" in Studies in Italian American Folklore. Del Giudice, Luisa, Editor. Utah State University Press, 1993.
"Lacrime di sangue: La villanella calabrese in America," in Calabria dei paesi. Pitto, Cesare, Editor. 1990.
Malidittu la lingua/Damned Language, the Poetry of Vincenzo Ancona, with Joseph Sciorra. 2010, 1991.
"L'Esistenza in America della musica folkloristica del sud d'Italia: I suoi legami con la madrepatria", La Critica sociologica 80 (Inverno 1986–87).
 "Voluntary Aid and Private Voluntary Assistance", in Reconstruction and Socio-cultural System: A Long-range Study of Reconstruction Processes Following the November 23, 1980 Earthquake in Southern Italy. Report No. 1 to the National Science Foundation, by Rocco Caporale, Ino Rossi, and Anna L. Chairetakis. Washington, D.C.
"Giuseppe De Franco (1933–2010): A Remembrance of an Immigrant Folk Musician" in The Italian American Review 1 (2): 2011.
Review of "The Polyphony of Ceriana: The Compagna Sacco, Hugo Zemp, Director. American Anthropologist 114 (4), 696-697. 2012.
"Reflections on Musical Practice and Conservation Opportunities in Karpathos". ΠΡΑΚΤΙΚΑ Δ' ΔΙΕΘΝΟΥΣ ΣΥΝΕΔΡΙΟΥ ΚΑΡΠΑΘΙΑΚΗΣ ΛΑΟΓΡΑΦΙΑΣ (8-12 ΜΑΪΟΥ 2013). University of Athens. 2016.
"Like a Cry from the Heart: An Insider's View of the Genesis of Alan Lomax's Ideas and the Legacy of His Research": Part I. Ethnomusicology 62 (2), 230–264. 2018.
"Like a Cry from the Heart: An Insider's View of the Genesis of Alan Lomax's Ideas and the Legacy of His Research": Part IIl. Ethnomusicology 62 (3): 403–438. 2018.
"Return to Sicily." In Street Cries and Narrative Traditions (Suoni e Cultura). Sergio Bonanzinga & Luisa Del Giudice, Editors. Museo Internazionale delle Marionette, Palermo: 17–40. 2020.
"Stories of an Archive: Association for Cultural Equity (ACE)" Etnografie Sonore 11 (2), 186–187. 2020.
"Human and automated judgements of musical similarity in a global sample" H Daikoku, S Ding, US Sanne, E Benetos, AL Wood, S Fujii, PE Savage. PsyArXiv Preprints. 2020.

Awards
Grammy nomination for Best Historical Box Set: Alan Lomax in Haiti, Harte Records, 2011
Grammy Award for Best Historical Box Set: Jelly Roll Morton: The Complete Library of Congress Recordings by Alan Lomax, 2005
Cavaliere in the Order of Merit, Republic of Italy, 1980
Emmy nomination for In the Footsteps of Columbus NBC-TV, 1976

External links
The Association for Cultural Equity
Lomax Digital Archive
The Global Jukebox
Alan Lomax Archive on YouTube

Anna Lomax Wood on Google Scholar

Notes and references

1944 births
Living people
American anthropologists
American folklorists
Women folklorists
Columbia Graduate School of Arts and Sciences alumni
American women anthropologists
Lomax family
American people of English descent
Place of birth missing (living people)
21st-century American women
Columbia University School of General Studies alumni